William Huffman Cobblestone House is a historic home located at Phelps in Ontario County, New York. It was constructed in 1845 and is a distinct example of the late Federal / early Greek Revival style, cobblestone domestic architecture. The house consists of a two-story, three bay main block with a one-story side ell.  The exterior walls are built of evenly shaped and colored field cobbles.  It is one of approximately 101 cobblestone buildings in Ontario County and 26 in the village and town of Phelps.  Also on the property is a late 19th-century barn.

It was listed on the National Register of Historic Places in 2002.

References

Houses on the National Register of Historic Places in New York (state)
Greek Revival houses in New York (state)
Cobblestone architecture
Houses completed in 1845
Phelps, New York
Houses in Ontario County, New York
National Register of Historic Places in Ontario County, New York